Megalothorax minimus is a species of springtail in the family Neelidae. It is found in Europe.

References

Collembola
Articles created by Qbugbot
Animals described in 1900